Hay Lakes is a village in central Alberta, Canada. Hay Lakes was pioneered and settled primarily by immigrants from Sweden and Norway. Hay Lakes' founding pioneer was James McKernan who established a telegraph station in the area in 1876. In 1911 the Canadian National Railway began its Edmonton to Calgary line which ran through Hay Lakes. Hay Lakes was incorporated as a village in 1928. It was known as the Village of Hay Lake between 1928 and 1932.

Demographics 

In the 2016 Census of Population conducted by Statistics Canada, the Village of Hay Lakes recorded a population of 495 living in 191 of its 203 total private dwellings, a  change from its 2011 population of 425.

See also 
List of communities in Alberta
List of villages in Alberta

References

External links 

1928 establishments in Alberta
Villages in Alberta